The Central District of Fereydunkenar County is a district (bakhsh) in Fereydunkenar County, Mazandaran Province, Iran. At the 2006 census, its population was 38,958, in 10,555 families.  The District has one city: Fereydunkenar.  The District has one rural district (dehestan): Barik Rud Rural District.

References 

Fereydunkenar County
Districts of Mazandaran Province